The Public Religion Research Institute (PRRI) is an American nonprofit, nonpartisan research and education organization that conducts public opinion polls on a variety of topics, specializing in the quantitative and qualitative study of political issues as they relate to religious values. Studies and data produced by the PRRI have been used in a variety of peer-reviewed scholarly analyses of religion and American culture, including studies on economic inequality and questions of redistribution, attitudes toward immigration, attitudes toward climate change, and religious attitudes toward social prejudice.

Major research

In 2014, PRRI launched the American Values Atlas, an interactive online tool that provides information about religious, political and demographic composition for all 50 states and particular issues.

Robert P. Jones
Robert P. Jones is the founder and CEO of PRRI. He previously served as Assistant Professor of Religious Studies at Missouri State University. Jones holds a Ph.D. in Religion from Emory University and a M.Div. from Southwestern Baptist Theological Seminary. He is the author of The End of White Christian America (2016), which won the 2019 Grawemeyer Award in Religion. Jones is also the author of the 2020 book White Too Long: The Legacy of White Supremacy in American Christianity, in which he reveals that his distant relative who died in 1818 owned three slaves.

References

Public opinion research companies in the United States
Research institutes in Washington, D.C.
Think tanks based in Washington, D.C.
Social statistics data
2009 establishments in Washington, D.C.
Think tanks established in 2009